Jean-Christophe Attias (born 1958) is a French historian and scholar. He was born to an Algerian Jewish father and a Catholic mother from the Charente.

Jean-Christophe Attias is a Professor of medieval Jewish thought at the École pratique des hautes études (PSL University, Paris).

He is married to his colleague (and occasional coauthor) Esther Benbassa.

As an intellectual, Jean-Christophe Attias takes an active part in the French public debate. Especially involved in the fight against racism and discriminations, he cofounded the "Pari(s) du Vivre-Ensemble", an annual culture festival.

Research interests

 History of the Jewish exegesis of the Bible in the Middle Ages, especially in the XVth-XVIth Century Mediterranean (Spain and Byzantium), exegesis as a literary genre.
 History of culture and representations : the image of the proselyte in Jewish culture, Judaism and its « margins » (such as Karaism), the place of the « Land f Israel » in Jewish memory, etc.
 Place and function of the Bible in Jewish culture and imagination.
 Moses in Jewish and general culture.

Works

In English 
 Israel, the Impossible Land, Stanford, Stanford University Press, 2003 (with Esther Benbassa)
 The Jews and their Future. A Conversation on Jewish Identities, London, Zed Books, 2004 (with E. Benbassa)
 The Jew and the Other, Ithaca, Cornell University Press, 2004 (with E. Benbassa)
 The Jews and the Bible, Stanford, Stanford University Press, 2014;
 A Woman Called Moses. A Prophet for Our Time, Verso, 2020.

In French 

 Abraham Aboulafia. L'épître des sept voies, Paris, Éditions de l'Éclat, 1985 (translation and notes) ; new ed., Paris, Éditions de l'Éclat, 2008
 Le Commentaire biblique. Mordekhai Komtino ou l'herméneutique du dialogue, Paris, Cerf, 1991
 Isaac Abravanel, la mémoire et l'espérance, Paris, Cerf, 1992
 Penser le judaïsme, Paris, CNRS Éditions, 2010 ; new revised and enlarged ed, Paris, CNRS Éditions, 2013
 Les Juifs et la Bible, Paris, Fayard, 2012 ; new ed., Paris, Cerf, 2014
 Moïse fragile, Paris, Alma, 2015 ; new ed., Paris, CNRS Éditions, 2016
 Un juif de mauvaise foi, Paris, Lattès, 2017
 Nos Conversations célestes, Paris, Alma, 2020 (novel)

With Esther Benbassa 

 Dictionnaire de civilisation juive, Paris, Larousse-Bordas, 1997 ; 2nd ed.,1998
 Israël imaginaire, Paris, Flammarion, 1998 ;  2nd ed., 2001 (sous le titre Israël, la terre et le sacré)
 Les Juifs ont-ils un avenir ?, Paris, Lattès, 2001 ;  2nd ed., Paris, Hachette, coll. « Pluriel », 2002
 Le Juif et l’Autre, Gordes, Le Relié, 2002
 Petite histoire du judaïsme, Paris, Librio, 2007
 Dictionnaire des mondes juifs, Paris, Larousse, 2008.

Editor 

 De la Conversion, Paris, Cerf, 1998
 Enseigner le judaïsme à l'Université, Genève, Labor et Fides, 1998 (withPierre Gisel)
 La  haine  de  soi.  Difficiles  identités, Bruxelles, Complexe, 2000 (withEsther Benbassa)
 Messianismes. Variations autour d’une figure juive, Genève, Labor et Fides, 2000 (with Pierre Gisel and Lucie Kaennel)
 De la Bible à la littérature, Genève, Labor et Fides, 2003 (with Pierre Gisel)
 Juifs et musulmans. Une histoire partagée, un dialogue à construire, Paris, La Découverte, 2006 (with Esther Benbassa)
 Les Sépharades et l’Europe. De Maïmonide à Spinoza, Paris, Presses de l’université Paris-Sorbonne, 2012
 Encyclopédie des religions, Paris, Fayard/Pluriel, 2012 (with Esther Benbassa)
 Dans les quartiers, l’égalité c’est maintenant ! Livre blanc, Paris, Le Pari(s) du Vivre-Ensemble, 2014 (with Esther Benbassa)
 Juifs et musulmans. Retissons les liens!, Paris, CNRS Éditions, 2015 (with Esther Benbassa)
 Nouvelles relégations territoriales, Paris, CNRS Éditions, 2017 (with Esther Benbassa)

Awards

 Seligmann Award against Racism, Injustice and Intolérance (2006).
 Prix Goncourt de la Biographie for Moïse fragile (2015).

References

External links 
 Personal website

20th-century French historians
1958 births
Living people
Academic staff of Paris Sciences et Lettres University
21st-century French historians
French people of Algerian-Jewish descent
Historians of Jews and Judaism